Gustav Ntiforo (born 26 March 1933 in Awisa) is a Ghanaian former sprinter who competed in the 1960 Summer Olympics.

References

1933 births
Living people
Ghanaian male sprinters
Olympic athletes of Ghana
Athletes (track and field) at the 1960 Summer Olympics
People from Eastern Region (Ghana)
20th-century Ghanaian people
21st-century Ghanaian people